Prothoate is an organothiophosphate insecticide also used as an acaricide.

It is listed as an extremely hazardous substance according to the U.S. Emergency Planning and Community Right-to-Know Act.

References

External links
 

Acetylcholinesterase inhibitors
Organophosphate insecticides
Acaricides
Ethyl esters
Isopropylamino compounds